January is a surname. It is derived from the name of the month, which comes from Janus, a Roman god who stood for beginnings and transitions.

People
 Briann January (born 1987), American professional basketball player
 Don January (born 1929), American professional golfer
 Glenn January (born 1983), Canadian professional football player
 Lois January (1913–2006), American actress
 One of three brothers who were American amateur soccer players:
 Charles January (1888–1970)
 John January (1882–1917)
 Thomas January (1886–1957)

Fictional
 Annie January, also known as Starlight, a character from the The Boys franchise
 Donna January, the mother of Annie January in The Boys

See also
January (given name)
January (disambiguation)

References